The Quantock Greenway is a footpath in the Quantock Hills in Somerset, England, which opened in 2001.

It travels through many different types of landscape, including deciduous and coniferous woodland, private parkland, grazed pasture and cropped fields.

See also

Long-distance footpaths in the UK

References

External links 
The Quantock Greenway

Long-distance footpaths in England
Footpaths in Somerset